Li Shaojie (born November 26, 1975) is a male Chinese discus thrower. His personal best throw is 65.16 metres, achieved in May 1996 in Nanjing. This is the current Chinese record.

In 1998 he won the Asian Championships and the Asian Games, and was selected to represent Asia at the 1998 World Cup where he finished seventh. He finished ninth at the 1999 World Championships.

International competitions

References

1975 births
Living people
Chinese male discus throwers
Olympic athletes of China
Athletes (track and field) at the 1998 Asian Games
Athletes (track and field) at the 1996 Summer Olympics
Athletes (track and field) at the 2000 Summer Olympics
Asian Games medalists in athletics (track and field)
World Athletics Championships athletes for China
Asian Games gold medalists for China
People from Penglai, Shandong
Sportspeople from Yantai
Medalists at the 1998 Asian Games
20th-century Chinese people